Marvel's Spider-Man may refer to:
 Spider-Man, a fictional superhero appearing in American comic books published by Marvel Comics
 Spider-Man (2017 TV series), a 2017 animated series produced by Marvel Animation
 Marvel's Spider-Man (Insomniac Games series), a series of action-adventure video games based on the character developed by Insomniac Games and published by Sony Interactive Entertainment.
 Marvel's Spider-Man (2018 video game), a 2018 video game developed by Insomniac Games for PlayStation 4, PlayStation 5 and Microsoft Windows
 Marvel's Spider-Man: Miles Morales, a 2020 video game developed by Insomniac Games for PlayStation 4, PlayStation 5 and Microsoft Windows